Changing Faces – The Best of Louise is a compilation album by the British singer Louise. It was released in 2001 and peaked at number 9 on the UK Albums Chart.

After her third solo album, Elbow Beach, Redknapp was coming to the end of her five-album deal with EMI (which included the album Always & Forever which she had made with Eternal). It was decided that a greatest hits package would be released, incorporating all of Louise's 15 top-10 hit singles. The album featured three new tracks and be Louise's final release under EMI. For the album Louise released a cover of "Stuck in the Middle with You", which entered the UK chart at number 4 and was supported by a humorous promo video that spoofed the Quentin Tarantino film Reservoir Dogs. The album was a UK top 10 hit and was certified Silver by the BPI for UK sales of over 60,000 copies.

In support of the album, Louise embarked on the second solo tour of her career, playing smaller locations across the country. After the touring and promotion for Changing Faces, Louise officially left EMI.

Track listing

Charts

Certifications

References

2001 greatest hits albums
Louise Redknapp albums